The Torres Strait Treaty is a treaty signed between Australia and Papua New Guinea. The treaty defined the border between Australia and Papua New Guinea following the latter's independence from Australia in 1975. The treaty also set out the manner in which the common border area would be managed. The treaty was signed in December 1978 and came into effect in 1985.

The treaty is named for the Torres Strait that separates mainland Australia and Papua New Guinea.

Boundaries
The treaty defines two boundaries between Australia and Papua New Guinea

Seabed Jurisdiction Line–Australia and Papua New Guinea have rights to all things on or below the seabed on their respective sides of this line
Fisheries Jurisdiction Line–Australia and Papua New Guinea have rights to swimming fish on their respective sides of the line. Both countries have agreed to share these rights.

Despite being located on the Papua New Guinea side of the Seabed Jurisdiction Line, the following islands belong to Australia:
Anchor Cay, 
Aubusi Island, 
Black Rocks, 
Boigu Island, 
Bramble Cay, 
Dauan Island, 
Deliverance Island, 
East Cay, 
Kaumag Island, 
Kerr Islet, 
Moimi Island, 
Pearce Cay, 
Saibai Island, 
Turnagain Island and 
Turu Cay.

Protected Zone
The treaty also established the Torres Strait Protected Zone. The aim of the Protected Zone is to allow indigenous Torres Strait Islanders and coastal Papua New Guinea people to maintain their traditional ways of life. The treaty "allows traditional people to move freely within the Protected Zone (without passports or visas) for traditional purposes."

The following villages in Papua New Guinea have traditional rights under this treaty to enter into the Australian-controlled part of the Protected Zone. These are known as the "Treaty Villages".
Bula,
 Mari, 
Jarai, 
Tais, 
Buji/Ber, 
Sigabadaru, 
Mabadauan, 
Old Mawatta, 
Ture Ture, 
Kadawa, 
Katatai,
Parama, and 
Sui

References

External links
Torres Strait Treaty - Australasian Legal Information Institute

Foreign relations of Papua New Guinea
Treaties of Australia
Treaties concluded in 1978
Boundary treaties
Australia–Papua New Guinea relations
1978 in Australia